Screamin' the Blues is an album by American saxophonist Oliver Nelson, originally released in 1961 on New Jazz Records.

Track listing

Personnel
Oliver Nelson – tenor saxophone, alto saxophone
Eric Dolphy – bass clarinet, alto saxophone
Richard Williams – trumpet
Richard Wyands – piano
George Duvivier – bass
Roy Haynes – drums

References

New Jazz Records albums
Oliver Nelson albums
1961 albums
Albums recorded at Van Gelder Studio
Albums produced by Esmond Edwards